Guardian Angel (Chinese: 守護神之保險調查) is a 2018 Hong Kong insurance drama produced by Shaw Brothers Studio. It stars Michael Miu, Bosco Wong, Annie Liu and Kate Tsui as the main cast, with Benz Hui, Hugo Ng, Alex Lam, MC Jin, Mimi Kung as the major supporting cast.

Synopsis
Northern Lights Insurance Company has a team of insurance investigators that is led by Fong Chi-keung (Benz Hui), who loves to make impromptu jokes, and includes wealthy heiress Dou Sum-yu (Annie Liu), the affectionate Bak Tin-ming (Bosco Wong), and retired police officer Cheung Tung (Michael Miu). They each have their own talents and form a legendary team in the insurance industry. They manage to thoroughly investigate and uncover the truth in all the thorny, dangerous or strange cases that are passed to them. Although 9 out of 10 cases end up with the insurance company paying out money, their mission is to discover the truth. Fairness, impartiality and righteousness are their guiding principles. The three investigators are like special agents, conducting cross-border investigations, searching for clues, following targets and gathering evidence. At the same time, they unintentionally become involved in many people's stories and become their guardian angel.

Cast

Main cast

Other main cast members

Insurance Cases

Case #1 – Fake Doctor Paper Fraud Insurance (Ep 1)

Case investigated by Dou Sum-yu and Bak Tin-ming.

Lokyii as Tracy. Bak Tin-ming investigates her as they think she is getting fake doctor's paper to get away from work and get insurance money.

Case #2 – Malaysia Beach Carnival Big Bang (Ep 1–2)

Case investigated by Cheung Tung, Bak Tin-ming, and Do Sum-yu.

Jeannie Chan as Joanne, the injured female. She is Fok Chung's girlfriend and was seriously injured in the first episode. She was able to recover.
Tong Wu Tsz-Tung as Jack Fok Chung (霍聰), Joanne's boyfriend. He crashed his car through the market afterwards making many injured and many terrorist claimed this attack as theirs.
Lam Yiu-sing as Li Yin-ka (李彥嘉). Moon's boyfriend. He wanted to retaliate against Lam Kwong-ming for his frivolousness, the fireworks she put in his back pocket triggered the incident.
Evelyn On Hei Ting as Moon. li Yin-ka's girlfriend.
Unknown Actor as Lam Kwok-ming (林光明), was retaliated by Li Yin-ka for being frivolous at the scene of the carnival. He was killed by the fireworks and dust explosion caused by Li Yin-ka in his back pocket.

Case #3 – Bank Robbery (Ep 3–5)

Case investigated by Cheung Tung.

Philip Keung as “Thin Ribs” (排骨細), Ah Bi's father  betrayed his brother, Long Dabao. In episode 4, he was chased by the gang after his daughter robbed the gang's money. In episode 5, he was almost killed by the gang. Fortunately, Cheung Tung and Bak Tin-ming arrived to save him. Because his daughter murdered someone to save him, he cleaned her daughter's finger prints on the knife and put his. He was arrested and jailed for murder and robbery.
Hedwig Tam Sin-yin as Ah Bi, Thin Ribs’ daughter. In episode 4, she and her dad were chased by the gang after she robbed the gang's money. In episode 5, he was almost killed by the gang. Fortunately, Cheung Tung and Bak Tin-ming arrived to save him. Because she murdered someone to save her dad, her dad cleaned her finger prints on the knife and put his. Her dad, Thin Ribs, was arrested and jailed for murder and robbery.
Singh Hartihan Bitto as Long Dabao. He is a bank security guard and was the security guard present during the robbery. Cheung Tung is his idol. In episode 3, he was shot in the chest and almost died. In episode 4, while in hospital, he was mistaken for taking part in the bank robbery because his brother, Thin Ribs hid 20,000 yuan in his drawer as a sorry.

Case #4 – Fake Will (Ep 3–7)

Case investigated by Bak Tin-ming and Do Sum-yu.

Maggie Shiu as Linda Wong Lin (黃蓮). She is suspected of killing off the husbands who have changed there will to her so that she will get all the money. She now has a new man who is an old man named Richard, who later changes his will to her name instead of his kids. He has blood cancer and needs a matching bone marrow. The chances were very small but Linda tried and at the end, hers matched and Richard could recover. She also spent many of her late husbands will money on fighting court cases in Taiwan.
Johnny Ngan Kwok Leung as Richard (陳李察). He has blood cancer and his first wife pasted away. He met Linda when dancing outside. He changed the name of his will to her and she tests to see if her bone marrow matches. At the end, her bone marrow matched and according to Bak Tin-ming, he guessed Richard could live another 10 years. He is also the owner of a seafood shop.

Case #5 – Mini Storage Fire (Ep 8–9)

Case investigated by Cheung Tung, Bak Tin-ming, and Do Sum-yu.

Evergreen Mak Cheung-ching as Yan Chi-hang, In episode 8, himself, Ah Wing, and Uncle Mi ate hot pot in his mini-storage shop to celebrate Uncle Mi's birthday. They ate it in a secretly built and illegal room in his shop. After a sudden and strong shake like an earthquake occurring in the building, Uncle Mi accidentally overturned the stove and caused a serious fire. The sudden shake in the building was later found out to be because of a diamond robbery (Case #7). Because of the fire, it caused nearly all the objects in the mini-storage to be burned, and many tenants demanded huge compensation from Yan Chi-hang.
Simon Lo Man Kit as Ah Wing(阿榮), street cleaner and good friend of Yan Chi-hang and Uncle Mi. In episode 8, they ate hot pot in Yan Chi-hang's mini-storage shop to celebrate Uncle Mi's birthday. They ate it in a secretly built and illegal room in the shop. After a sudden and strong shake like an earthquake occurring in the building, Uncle Mi accidentally overturned the stove and caused a serious fire. The sudden shake in the building was later found out to be because of a diamond robbery (Case #7).
Lok San-mak as Uncle Mi (迷叔). He lives on the street and is good friends with Yan Chi-hang and Ah Wing. In episode 8, himself, Yan Chi-hang, and Ah Wing ate hot pot in Yan Chi-hang's mini-storage shop to celebrate his birthday. They ate it in a secretly built and illegal room in the shop. After a sudden and strong shake like an earthquake occurring in the building, he accidentally overturned the stove and caused a serious fire. The sudden shake in the building was later found out to be because of a diamond robbery (Case #7).

Case #6 -Post-traumatic stress claims (Ep 9–13)

Case investigated by Bak Tin-ming and Do Sum-yu.

Angie Cheong as Mak Chi-man or Ms. Mak (麥子文), singer and music teacher. She is Gordon's mom and Ma Ho-tin's ex-wife. She used Gordon's post-kidnapping to make it seem like Gordon cannot talk because of the kidnapping when actually, she told Gordon to do it.
Max Wong as Gordon, Ms. Mak's son. He is a rising kid singer. He was kidnapped and had trauma because of this. However, his mom used his kidnapping to try to get the insurance money. Bak Tin-Ming and Do Sum-yu thought he actually had Post Traumatic Stress Syndrome making him unable to talk but later, Gordon goes out to sing behind his mom's back. Later, it is discovered Gordon has trama as he was scared of fire and the dark and that his mom was keeping him from talking to get the insurance money. 
Wilson Tsui as Ma Ho-Tin (馬浩田), father of Gordon and ex-husband of Ms. Mak. He divorced Ms. Mak because he loved another woman who in Case #7, turns out to be tricking him and just taking his money. He is very regretful about divorcing. He is the owner of a diamond company that appears in Case #7.

Case #7 – Diamond Burglary Case (Ep 10–11)

Case investigated by Cheung Tung and Do Sum-yu.

Wilson Tsui as Ma Ho-tin (馬浩田), the owner of the diamond company. In episode 10, he reported that a batch of diamonds worth 50 million were stolen. In fact, he stole the diamonds to pay the ransom to his son's kidnapped and reported them as lost in order to defraud insurance money. He kidnapped Dou Sum-yu but Cheung Tung saved her and he told him about Chan Fai and him pushing him onto the street and about what Lau Chun-jun did. 
Iris Chung as Lau Chun-jun (劉俊軍), Ma Ho-Tin's secretary and girlfriend. Chan Fai's mistress. Herself and Chan Fai plotted and tried to steal the diamonds. In episode 11, she was arrested by the police for being part of the attempted robbery which caused the building to shake. 
Deon Cheung Chi as Chan Fai (陳輝), Lau Chun-jun's lover. Plotted with Lau Chun-jun to steal the diamonds and he exploded the safe door, but because the explosives used were too powerful, it caused a strong shaking in the building and indirectly caused a serious fire in the mini-storage below. In episode 11, he obtained evidence that Ma Ho-tin stole diamonds and is defrauding to obtain insurance money. He used this to threaten Ma Ho-tin but was subsequently pushed out of the road by Ma Ho-tin and killed by the incoming car.

Case #8 – Emerald Necklace Stealing the Dragon and Turning the Phoenix (Episode 14–16) 

Case investigated by Cheung Tung, Bak Tin-ming and Do Sum-yu.

Irene Wan as Sister Mi (Mi姐), outdated idol and actress. She was dissatisfied with the jewellery company's replacement of spokespersons and was not taken seriously by the company, so she deliberately exchanged the genuine and fake necklaces to play tricks on the jewellery company. After that, her house was stolen by her driver, and the emerald necklace was also stolen by the driver.
Louis Yan as Leung Mei (森美), the magician of the magic show Sister Mi was on. Was suspected by Bak Tin-ming of being the one that stole the necklace during the performance.
Zhihui Yu as Crystal, Sister Mi's Assistant/President of Sister Mi Fan Club.
Virginia Lau as Cherry, the person in charge of the Emerald Necklace Company. Made a fake for Sister Mi to wear outside the time of the media.

Case #9 – Concealing the condition and wealthy competition (episodes 16–18

Case investigated by Cheung Tung, Bak Tin-ming, and Do Sum-yu.

Ko Chun-man as Lam Chuen-yat (林泉溢), Pang Wai-ling's husband and an antique shop owner. Lam Chuen-hoi and Lam Chuen-yang's brother. Pang Yiu-yeung's brother-in-law. He was seriously injured in a traffic accident while taking his wife to the hospital in episode 17 and was admitted to the hospital. In episode 18, when he was critically ill, Pang Yiu-yeung had his oxygen hose removed causing him to die.
Akina Hong-wah as Pang Wai-ling (彭慧玲), Lam Chuen-yat's wife and Pang Yiu-yeung's sister. She suffers from gastric/stomach cancer. She was exposed by Dou Sun-yu after she purchased life insurance but concealed her condition. As a result, she was unable to obtain compensation. In episode 17, she was seriously injured in a traffic accident with her husband, Lam Chuen-yat and was admitted to the hospital. She was in critical condition and her husband was also in critical condition. Her husband was killed by her brother, Pang Yiu-yeung.
King Kong Lee as Pang Yiu-yeung (彭耀陽), Pang Wai-ling's brother. In episode 17, Dou Sum-yu ordered her sister's life insurance to be cancelled because she did not say she had stomach cancer. He hates Pang Wai-ling's husband, Lam Chuen-yat, and stole the jade bracelet from Lam Chuen-yat's antique shop in episode 17. In episode 18, he was fighting for her sister and brother-in-law, Lam Chuen-yat's inheritance, but whoever died first, the one still surviving's family would get the money because the two would anyway die from their injuries. He was discovered by Dou Sum-yu when he pulled Lam Chuen-yat's oxygen hose causing Lam Chuen-yat's death: he was subdued by medical staff, and was arrested by the police.
Eric Cheng Kai-tai as Lam Chuen-hoi, (林泉海) Lam Chuen-yat and Lam Chuen-yang's brother.
Casper Chan Sze-tsai as Lam Chuen-yang (林泉洋), alarm Chuen-yat and Lam Chuen-hoi's brother.
Unknown Actor as “Golden Retriever” (金毛), one of Pang Yiu-yeung's men.

Case #10 – Using the elderly to apply for insurance to defraud insurance money (Episode 19–20) 

Case investigated by Cheung Tung.

Lo Hei-loi as (梅院長), The godmother of Yip Chi and the director of the nursing home. She used Yip Chi to defraud. In episode 19, Yip Chi reported her to the police and she was arrested in episode 20.

Case #11 – Athlete Claims (Episode 20–22) 

Case investigated by Bak Tin-ming and Do Sum-yu.

Telford Wong Ting-fung as Fong Chi-ming (方志明), the boyfriend of Chan On-yee, broke up for a while, but reunited later. Janice's swimming coach. He also suffers from heart problem which can lead to heart attacks. In the past six months, he reported 15 times that he was injured for different reasons and filed a claim with the insurance company. The amount ranges from $8000 – $1.5 million.
Stephanie Au Hoi Shun as Chan On-yee (陳安兒), The girlfriend of the Hong Kong team swimmer Fong Chi-ming, broke up for a while, but reunited later. Likes bowling and got into bowling because of Andy Lau.
Brian Wong Chak-fung as Hong Kong National Swimming Team Coach.
Liu Siyuan as Janice. Her mentor is Fong Chi-ming.
Damon Law as Ah Fung, a TV station host.

Case #12 – Missing Doctor Life Insurance Claim (Episode 22–24) 

Case investigated by Cheung Tung, Bak Tin-ming, and Do Sum-yu.

Zhai Tianlin as Ben Wong Kam-wing/Zheng Ping (黃錦榮/鄭平), Rex's friend. He pretended to be Zheng Ping who sells fruits in the Vietnam Village in Prague. He pretends to be Zheng Ping because in Hong Kong, he was a surgeon who was accused of manslaughter in a medical error six years ago. He jumped off the boat and pretended to commit suicide because of fear of going to prison. Purchased Zheng Ping's household registration status and lived as Zheng Ping. Seven years after his disappearance, his family intends to apply to the court for his death and receive life insurance compensation, but he was later found to have appeared in the news of the Prague Square shooting as the hero who saved many people. During the investigation, he has always denied his identify as Wong Kam-wing and planned to commit suicide as Zheng Ping, but after Dou Sum-yu took his daughter to see him, he decided to give up suicide and was willing to return to Hong Kong to accept legal sanctions.
MC Jin as Rex, a friend of Zheng Ping. Owner of a hot dog stall in Prague's Vietnam Village. At the end of episode 22, he found out that what Cheung Tung and Bak Tin-ming said were real because Zheng Ping showed him his passport with the name Wong Kam-wing. He was rescued by Wong Kam-wing when he was stabbed by a knife when he was young. In episode 23, he helped exchange the DNA box of Zheng Ping so that Cheung Tung and Bak Tin-ming would not get Zheng Ping's real DNA of Wong Kam-wing. Also, in episode 23, he was seriously injured by blocking a gun for Zheng Ping/Wong Kam-wing and Zheng Ping helped him do first aid and pull out the bullet to save his life.
Pancy Chan as Helen, Wong Kam-wing's wife. She intends to apply to the court to pronounce Wong Kam-wing dead and receive life insurance compensation after Wong Kam-wing disappeared for seven years.
Constance Kong as Bobo, Wong Kam-wing's daughter. 
Kelvin Chan Kin-long as an Interpol. He defies the Vietnamese gang when hunting down Zheng Ping, who was impersonated by Wong Kam-wing. He later died.

References

 https://encoretvb.com/english/series/118-Guardian_Angel 

http://www.chinesedrama.info/2018/11/web-drama-guardian-angel.html
 :zh:守護神之保險調查
http://chinesemov.com/tv/2018/Guardian-Angel.html
https://www.jaynestars.com/news/michael-miu-and-bosco-wongs-guardian-angels-to-air-after-fist-fight/
https://www.jaynestars.com/news/bosco-wong-has-good-chemistry-with-annie-liu/
邵氏兄弟《守護神之保險調查》劇集簡介

2018 television films